Sindel Point (‘Nos Sindel’ \'nos 'sin-del\) is a low ice-free point on the east coast of Livingston Island in the South Shetland Islands, Antarctica projecting 250 m into Moon Bay to separate the glacier termini of Kaliakra Glacier to the north and Struma Glacier to the south.  Situated 2.9 km northeast of Sliven Peak and 5.75 km southwest of Edinburgh Hill.

The point is named after the settlement of Sindel in northeastern Bulgaria.

Location
Bulgarian topographic survey Tangra 2004/05 and mapping in 2009.

Map
L.L. Ivanov. Antarctica: Livingston Island and Greenwich, Robert, Snow and Smith Islands. Scale 1:120000 topographic map.  Troyan: Manfred Wörner Foundation, 2009.

References
 Sindel Point. SCAR Composite Gazetteer of Antarctica.
 Bulgarian Antarctic Gazetteer. Antarctic Place-names Commission. (details in Bulgarian, basic data in English)

External links
 Sindel Point. Copernix satellite image

Headlands of Livingston Island
Bulgaria and the Antarctic